Sagran (also Romanized as Sagrān and Sakrān) is a village in Miyan Taleqan Rural District, in the Central District of Taleqan County, Alborz Province, Iran. At the 2006 census, its population was 236, in 61 families.

References 

Populated places in Taleqan County